The  (English: Museum of America) is a Spanish national museum of arts, archaeology and ethnography in Madrid. Its collections cover the whole of the Americas and range from the Paleolithic period to the present day.

It is owned by the Spanish State and its initial pieces came from the former collection of American archaeological and ethnographic artifacts from the National Archaeological Museum, also exhibiting a number of unrelated donations, deposits and purchases.

History 
The institution was founded via a decree from 19 April 1941 and opened in 1944 inside the building hosting the National Archaeological Museum. After all the initial pieces were moved to a newly built premises in the Ciudad Universitaria, the building was thus inaugurated on 12 October 1965. After a series of refurbishment works on the building (previously shared with a number of unrelated institutions), the museum was reopened on 12 October 1994, this time while holding the exclusivity on the use of the building. As part of preparation for the re-opening, a collecting programme was established, with Dominican and Haitian artefacts sourced by the anthropologist Soraya Aracena.

Collection 
The permanent exhibit is divided into five major thematic areas:
An awareness of the Americas
The reality of the Americas
Society
Religion
Communication

See also 
 Museo Nacional de Antropología (Madrid), also featuring American pieces

References 
Citations

Bibliography

External links

Northwest Coast art in the Museo de América
Official website

Mesoamerican art museums
Americas
Pre-Columbian art museums
Americas
Americas
Art museums established in 1941
1941 establishments in Spain
Bien de Interés Cultural landmarks in Madrid
Buildings and structures in Ciudad Universitaria neighborhood, Madrid